The United States and Papua New Guinea established diplomatic relations upon the latter's independence on September 16, 1975. The two nations belong to a variety of regional organizations, including the Asia-Pacific Economic Cooperation (APEC) forum; the ASEAN Regional Forum (ARF); the Pacific Community (SPC); and the South Pacific Regional Environmental Program (SPREP).

One of the most successful cooperative multilateral efforts linking the U.S. and Papua New Guinea is the U.S.-Pacific Islands Multilateral Tuna Fisheries Treaty, under which the U.S. grants $18 million per year to Pacific Island parties and the latter provide access for U.S. fishing vessels. The United States has provided significant humanitarian assistance to Papua New Guinea and contributed to the rehabilitation of Bougainville. USAID funds a $1.5 million-per-year HIV/AIDS project in Papua New Guinea.

The U.S. also supports Papua New Guinea's efforts to protect biodiversity. The U.S. Government supports the International Coral Reef Initiative aimed at protecting reefs in tropical nations such as Papua New Guinea. U.S. military forces, through Pacific Command (PACOM) in Honolulu, Hawaii, provide training to the Papua New Guinea Defense Force (PNGDF) and have held small-scale joint training exercises. The U.S. provides police and other education and training courses to national security officials. The U.S. also annually sponsors a handful of PNG officials and private citizens to meet and confer with their professional counterparts and to experience the U.S. first-hand through the  International Visitor Leadership Program (IVLP).

The U.S. Peace Corps ceased operations in Papua New Guinea in 2001 due to security concerns. About 2,000 U.S. citizens live in Papua New Guinea, with major concentrations at the headquarters of New Tribes Mission (a missionary organization), and the Summer Institute of Linguistics, both located in the Eastern Highlands Province.

The U.S. maintains an embassy in Port Moresby, Papua New Guinea. Papua New Guinea has an embassy in Washington, D.C.

References

External links
 History of Papua New Guinea - U.S. relations
 Embassy of Papua New Guinea to the Americas in Washington, DC.

 
Bilateral relations of the United States
United States